V is an American science fiction television series that ran for two seasons on ABC, from November 3, 2009 to March 15, 2011. A remake of the 1983 miniseries created by Kenneth Johnson, the new series chronicles the arrival on Earth of a technologically-advanced alien species which ostensibly comes in peace, but actually has sinister motives. V stars Elizabeth Mitchell and Morena Baccarin, and is executive produced by Scott Rosenbaum, Yves Simoneau, Scott Peters, Steve Pearlman, and Jace Hall. The series was produced by The Scott Peters Company, HDFilms and Warner Bros. Television.

Series overview

Episodes

Season 1 (2009–10) 
The first season of the re-imagining of V consisted of 12 episodes and premiered at 8:00 pm ET on ABC on November 3, 2009. Four episodes were aired in November 2009 and the series then went on hiatus before returning on March 30, 2010 when it aired in a new time slot, 10:00 pm ET. A special clip show titled "The Arrival" that recaps the first four episodes aired on March 23, 2010. The first four episodes averaged 9.75 million viewers; when the series returned in 2010 for the remainder of its first season in a new timeslot, the final episodes averaged 5.72 million viewers. In total, the first season averaged 7.74 million viewers.

Season 2 (2011)

ABC announced V would return on January 4, 2011 for a second season, airing on Tuesdays at 9:00 pm ET. It contained a reduced order of 10 episodes. Charles Mesure, who portrays Kyle Hobbes, was promoted to a series regular. Jane Badler appears in a recurring role as Anna's mother, Diana, the previous leader of the Visitors. Badler portrayed the main antagonist, also called Diana, in the original V television series from the 1980s though the new character of Diana in the re-imagined version of V is somewhat different from Badler's original role. Marc Singer, who also appeared in the original V series as the protagonist Mike Donovan, appeared as Project Ares leader Lars Tremont in the season finale.

References

External links 
 
 

Lists of American science fiction television series episodes
V (2009 TV series) episodes
it:V (serie televisiva)#Episodi